Mitchel Lasser is an American lawyer, currently the Jack G. Clarke Professor of Law at Cornell Law School, and formerly the Samuel D. Thurman Professor at S.J. Quinney College of Law, University of Utah and the Maurice R. Greenberg Visiting Professor at Yale Law School in 2007–2008.

Education
B.A., Yale College, 1986
J.D., Harvard Law School, 1989
M.A., Yale University, 1990
Ph.D., Yale University, 1995

References

Year of birth missing (living people)
Living people
Cornell Law School faculty
University of Utah faculty
Yale College alumni
Harvard Law School alumni